The geography of Israel is very diverse, with desert conditions in the south, and snow-capped mountains in the north. Israel is located at the eastern end of the Mediterranean Sea in Western Asia. It is bounded to the north by Lebanon, the northeast by Syria, the east by Jordan and the West Bank, and to the southwest by Egypt. To the west of Israel is the Mediterranean Sea, which makes up the majority of Israel's  coastline, and the Gaza Strip. Israel has a small coastline on the Red Sea in the south.

The Israeli-occupied territories include the West Bank, East Jerusalem,  and the Golan Heights, . Geographical features in these territories will be noted as such. Of these areas, Israel has annexed East Jerusalem and the Golan Heights, an act not recognized by the international community.

The inland area of central Israel is dominated by the Judean Hills of the West Bank, whilst the central and northern coastline consists of the flat and fertile Israeli coastal plain. Inland, the northern region contains the Mount Carmel mountain range, which is followed inland by the fertile Jezreel Valley, and then the hilly Galilee region.

Location and boundaries

Israel lies to the north of the equator around 31°30' north latitude and 34°45' east longitude. It measures  from north to south and, at its widest point , from east to west. At its narrowest point, however, this is reduced to just . It is ranked 153 on the List of countries and outlying territories by total area.

Prior to the establishment of the British Mandate for Palestine, there was no clear-cut definition of the geographical and territorial limits of the area known as "Palestine." On the eve of World War I it was described by Encyclopædia Britannica as a "nebulous geographical concept." The Sykes-Picot Treaty in 1916 divided the region that later became Palestine into four political units. Under the British Mandate for Palestine, the first geo-political framework was created that distinguished the area from the larger countries that surrounded it. The boundary demarcation at this time did not introduce geographical changes near the frontiers and both sides of the border were controlled by the British administration.

Modern Israel is bounded to the north by Lebanon, the northeast by Syria, the east by Jordan and the West Bank, and to the southwest by Egypt. To the west of Israel is the Mediterranean Sea, which makes up the majority of Israel's 273 km (170 mi) coastline and the Gaza Strip. Israel has a small coastline on the Red Sea in the south. The southernmost settlement in Israel is the city of Eilat whilst the northernmost is the town of Metula. The territorial waters of Israel extend into the sea to a distance of twelve nautical miles measured from the appropriate baseline.

The statistics provided by the Israel Central Bureau of Statistics include the annexed East Jerusalem and Golan Heights, but exclude the West Bank and Gaza Strip. The population of Israel includes Israeli settlers in the West Bank. The route of the Israeli West Bank barrier incorporates some parts of the West Bank.

Physiographic regions

Israel is divided into four physiographic regions: the Mediterranean coastal plain, the Central Hills, the Jordan Rift Valley and the Negev Desert.

Coastal plain

The Israeli Coastal Plain stretches from the Lebanese border in the north to Gaza in the south, interrupted only by Cape Carmel at Haifa Bay. The region is fertile and humid (historically malarial) and is known for its citrus orchards and viticulture. The plain is traversed by several short streams. From north to south these are: Kishon, Hadera, Alexander, Poleg, and Yarkon. All of these streams were badly polluted, but in the last ten years much work has been done to clean them up. Today the Kishon, Alexander and Yarkon again flow year round, and also have parks along their banks.

Geographically, the region is divided into five sub-regions. The northernmost section lays between the Lebanese border, the Western Galilee to the east, and the sea. It stretches from Rosh HaNikra in the north and down to Haifa, Israel's third-largest city. It is a fertile region, and off the coast there are many small islands. Along the Mount Carmel range is Hof HaCarmel, or the Carmel Coastal Plain. It stretches from the point where Mount Carmel almost touches the sea, at Haifa, and down to Nahal Taninim, a stream that marks the southern limit of the Carmel range. The Sharon Plain is the next section, running from Nahal Taninim (south of Zikhron Ya'akov) to Tel Aviv's Yarkon River. This area is Israel's most densely populated. South of this, running to Nahal Shikma, is the Central Coastal Plain, also known as the Western Negev. The last segment is the Southern Coastal Plain, which extends south around the Gaza Strip. It is divided into two – in the north, the Besor region, a savanna-type area with a relatively large number of communities, and south of it the Agur-Halutza region, which is very sparsely populated.

Central hills

Inland (east) of the coastal plain lies the central highland region. South of Jerusalem, also mainly within the West Bank, are the Judean Hills, including Mount Hebron.

Jordan Rift Valley

East of the central highlands lies the Jordan Rift Valley, which is a small part of the -long Syrian-East African Rift. In Israel the Rift Valley is dominated by the Jordan River, the Sea of Galilee (an important freshwater source also known as Lake Tiberias and Lake Kinneret), and the Dead Sea. The Jordan, Israel's largest river, originates in the Dan, Baniyas, and Hasbani rivers near Mount Hermon in the Anti-Lebanon Mountains and flows south through the drained Hula Basin into the freshwater Lake Tiberias. The Jordan River continues its course from the southern end of Lake Tiberias (forming the boundary between the West Bank and Jordan) to its terminus in the highly saline Dead Sea.

Negev Desert

Geographically it is an extension of the Sinai Desert, forming a rough triangle with its base in the north near Beersheba, the Dead Sea, and the southern Judean Mountains, and it has its apex in the southern tip of the country at Eilat. Topographically, it parallels the other regions of the country, with lowlands in the west, hills in the central portion, and the Arava valley as its eastern border.

Unique to the Negev region are the craterlike makhteshim cirques; Makhtesh Ramon, Makhtesh Gadol and Makhtesh Katan. The Negev is also sub-divided into five different ecological regions: northern, western and central Negev, the high plateau and the Arabah Valley. The northern Negev receives  of rain annually and has fairly fertile soils. The western Negev receives  of rain per year, with light and partially sandy soils. This can result in rare flash floods during heavy rains as water runs across the surface of the impervious desert soil. The area gets  of rain each year, with inferior and partially salty soils. The Arabah Valley along the Jordanian border stretches  from Eilat in the south to the tip of the Dead Sea in the north and is very arid with barely  of rain annually.

Geology

Israel is divided east–west by a mountain range running north to south along the coast. Jerusalem sits on the top of this ridge, east of which lies the Dead Sea graben which is a pull-apart basin on the Dead Sea Transform fault.

The numerous limestone and sandstone layers of the Israeli mountains serve as aquifers through which water flows from the west flank to the east. Several springs have formed along the Dead Sea, each an oasis, most notably the oases at Ein Gedi and Ein Bokek (Neve Zohar) where settlements have developed. Israel also has a number of areas of karst topography. Caves in the region have been used for thousands of years as shelter, storage rooms, barns and as places of public gatherings.

The far northern coastline of the country has some chalk landscapes best seen at Rosh HaNikra, a chalk cliff into which a series of grottoes have been eroded.

Seismic activity

The Jordan Rift Valley is the result of tectonic movements within the Dead Sea Transform (DSF) fault system. The DSF forms the transform boundary between the African Plate to the west and the Arabian Plate to the east. The Golan Heights and all of Jordan are part of the Arabian Plate, while the Galilee, West Bank, Coastal Plain, and Negev along with the Sinai Peninsula are on the African Plate. This tectonic disposition leads to a relatively high seismic activity in the region.

The entire Jordan Valley segment is thought to have ruptured repeatedly, for instance during the last two major earthquakes along this structure in 749 and 1033. The deficit in slip that has built up since the 1033 event is sufficient to cause an earthquake of ~7.4.

The most catastrophic earthquakes occurred in 31 BCE, 363, 749, and 1033 CE, that is every ca. 400 years on average. Destructive earthquakes leading to serious loss of life strike about every 80 years. While stringent construction regulations are currently in place and recently built structures are earthquake-safe, as of 2007 the majority of the buildings in Israel were older than these regulations and many public buildings as well as 50,000 residential buildings did not meet the new standards and were "expected to collapse" if exposed to a strong quake. Given the fragile political situation of the Middle East region and the presence there of major holy sites, a quake reaching magnitude 7 on the Richter scale could have dire consequences for world peace.

Rivers and lakes

The river flows south through the freshwater Sea of Galilee, and from there forms the boundary with the Kingdom of Jordan for much of its route, eventually emptying into the Dead Sea. The northern tributaries to the Jordan are the Dan, Banias, and Hasbani. Only the Dan is within undisputed Israel; the Hasbani flows from Lebanon and the Banias from territory captured from Syria in the Six-Day War.

The Sea of Galilee (also called the Kinneret) is Israel's largest and most important freshwater lake, located in the northeast of the country. The bed of the lake forms part of the Jordan Rift Valley.

To the north is the lake's greatest depth.

There are no navigable, artificial waterways in Israel, although the National Water Carrier, a conduit for drinking water, might be classified as such. The idea of a channel connecting the Mediterranean and Dead Seas or the Red and Dead Seas has been discussed.

Selected elevations

The following are selected elevations of notable locations, from highest to lowest:

Climate

Israel has a Mediterranean climate with long, hot, rainless summers and relatively short, cool, rainy winters (Köppen climate classification Csa). The climate is as such due to Israel's location between the subtropical aridity of the Sahara and the Arabian deserts, and the subtropical humidity of the Levant and Eastern Mediterranean. The climate conditions are highly variable within the state and modified locally by altitude, latitude, and the proximity to the Mediterranean.

Summers are very humid along the Mediterranean coast but dry in the central highlands, the Rift Valley, and the Negev Desert. In Eilat, a desert city, summer daytime-temperatures are often the highest in the state, at times reaching . More than 70% of the average rainfall in Israel falls between November and March; June through September are usually rainless. Rainfall is unevenly distributed, significantly lower in the south of the country. In the extreme south, rainfall averages near  annually; in the north, average annual rainfall exceeds . Rainfall varies from season to season and from year to year, particularly in the Negev Desert. Precipitation is often concentrated in violent storms, causing erosion and flash floods. In winter, precipitation often takes the form of snow at the higher elevations of the central highlands, including Jerusalem. Mount Hermon has seasonal snow which covers all three of its peaks in winter and spring. In rare occasions, snow gets to the northern mountain peaks and only in extremely rare occasions even to the coast.

Thunderstorms and hail are common throughout the rainy season and waterspouts occasionally hit the Mediterranean coast, capable of causing only minor damage. However, supercell thunderstorms and a true F2 tornado hit the Western Galilee in April 2006, causing significant damage and 75 injuries.

Heat waves are frequent. 2010 was the hottest year in the history of Israel with absolute record high in several places in August. The heat became stronger from August when temperatures were considerably above the average. October and November were also dry, and November was almost rainless when it was supposed to be rainy.

Climate charts of different locations in Israel

Natural resources
Unlike much of the Middle East which is rich in lucrative crude oil, Israel has limited natural resources. These include copper, phosphates, bromide, potash, clay, sand, sulfur, asphalt, and manganese. Small amounts of natural gas and crude oil are present, often too little to merit commercial extraction. In 2009, significant reserves of natural gas were discovered at the Tamar 1 offshore drilling site, 90 kilometers west of Haifa. It is the largest natural gas reserve ever discovered in Israel.

Environmental concerns

Israel has a large number of environmental concerns ranging from natural hazards to man-made issues both resulting from ancient times to modern development. Natural hazards facing the country include sandstorms which sometimes occur during spring in the desert south, droughts which are usually concentrated in summer months, flash floods which create great danger in the deserts due to their lack of notice, and regular earthquakes, most of which are small, although there is a constant risk due to Israel's location along the Jordan Rift Valley. Current environmental concerns include the lack of arable land and natural fresh water resources. Whilst measures have been taken to irrigate and grow in the desert, the amount of water needed here poses issues. Desertification is also a risk possible on the desert fringe, whilst air pollution from industrial and vehicle emissions and groundwater pollution from industrial and domestic waste are also issues facing the country. Furthermore, the effects of the use of chemical fertilizers, and pesticides are issues facing the country.
Israel has signed many international environmental agreements and is party to:
 Convention on Biological Diversity
 UNFCCC – Climate Change
 United Nations Convention to Combat Desertification
 Convention on the International Trade in Endangered Species of Wild Flora and Fauna
 Hazardous Wastes
 Nuclear Test Ban
 Montreal Protocol – Ozone Layer Protection
 MARPOL 73/78 – Ship Pollution
 Convention on Wetlands of International Importance Especially As Waterfowl Habitat

Signed but not ratified:
 Kyoto Protocol
 Marine Life Conservation

Rural settlements

Israel's rural space includes several unique kinds of settlements, notably the moshav and the kibbutz. Originally these were collective and cooperative settlements respectively. Over time, the degree of cooperation in these settlements has decreased and in several of them the cooperative structure has been dismantled altogether. All rural settlements and many small towns (some of which are dubbed "rurban settlements") are incorporated in regional councils. Land use in Israel is 17% arable land, 4% permanent crops, and 79% other uses. As of 2003  were irrigated.

There are 242 Israeli settlements and civilian land use sites in the West Bank, 42 in the Golan Heights, and 29 in East Jerusalem.

Islands
Israel has the Rosh Hanikra Islands and the Achziv Islands within its territorial waters. The Israeli government plans to build artificial islands off the coast to house an airport, a seaport, a desalination plant, a power plant, and a military testing base, as an answer to Israel's lack of space.

Human geography

As of 2013, the population of Israel is 8 million, 6,015,000 of them Jewish.

For statistical purposes, the country has three metropolitan areas; Gush Dan-Tel Aviv (population 3,150,000), Haifa (population 996,000), and Beersheba (population 531,600). Some argue that Jerusalem, Israel's largest city with a population of 763,600, and Nazareth, should also be classified as metropolitan areas. In total, Israel has 74 cities, 14 of which have populations of over 100,000. Other forms of local government in Israel are local councils of which there are 144 governing small municipalities generally over 2,000 in population, and regional councils of which there are 53, governing a group of small communities over a relatively large geographical area.

Israel's population is diverse demographically; 76% Jewish, 20% Arab, and 4% unaffiliated. In terms of religion, 76% are Jewish, 16% Muslim, 2% Christian, 2% Druze, and 4% are unclassified by choice. 8% of Israeli Jews are haredi; 9% are "religious", 12% "religious-traditionalists", 27% are "non-religious traditionalists", and 43% are "secular". Other small, but notable groups in Israel, include Circassians of whom there are approximately 3,000 living mostly in two northern villages, 2,500 Lebanese, and 5,000 Armenians predominantly in Jerusalem.

Overshoot index
Israel is ranked 34th in the world in terms of population density with, as noted, a climate of long, hot, rainless summers and relatively short, cool, rainy winters. The Population Matters 2011 overshoot index ranked Israel as the third most dependent region in the World after Singapore and Kuwait.

See also

 Archaeology of Israel
 Kurkar
 Land of Israel
 List of endemic flora of Israel
 Historical maps of Israel
 National parks and nature reserves of Israel
 Outline of Israel
 Tourism in Israel
 Wildlife of Israel

References

External links

Geography and Climate at the Israel Ministry of Foreign Affairs website
Geography and Nature at the Israel Ministry of Tourism website